The Coronation of the Virgin Altarpiece is a five panel work by Moretto da Brescia, executed . Its central panel (Coronation of the Virgin with Saints Michael, Joseph, Francis of Assisi and Nicholas of Bari) and upper panel (God the Father) are still in the church of Santi Nazaro e Celso in Brescia, whilst the two upper roundels (Gabriel and Virgin Mary, forming an Annunciation) and predella (Adoration of the Shepherds) are in the same church's rectory.

References

Paintings by Moretto da Brescia
1534 paintings
Paintings of the Coronation of the Virgin
Adoration of the Shepherds in art
Paintings depicting the Annunciation
Paintings of Saint Nicholas
Paintings of Saint Joseph
Paintings of Francis of Assisi
Paintings in Brescia
Paintings depicting Michael (archangel)
Altarpieces